Renew or renewal may refer to:

Media and entertainment
Renew (album), a 2002 album by The Badlees 
Renewal (film), a 2008 documentary on the religious environmental movement
Renewal (magazine), a UK journal of Labour politics
Renewal (Kreator album), an album by the thrash metal band Kreator
Renewal (Billy Strings album), a 2021 studio album by bluegrass musician Billy Strings
"Renewal", a song by Norwegian Black Metal band Dimmu Borgir from their album Abrahadabra
"Renewal", an episode of the sixth season of TV series Law & Order: Criminal Intent
 "Renewal" (Brooklyn Nine-Nine), an episode of the eighth season of Brooklyn Nine-Nine

Law
Contract renewal
Copyright renewal, the act of renewing copyright
Renewal of an expiring law or Act of Parliament
Renewal (broadcasting), the act for renewing a television series for further seasons
Renewal (parliamentary procedure), bringing up a motion again that has already been disposed of by the deliberative assembly
Renewal (patent), a maintenance fee

Religion
Renewal (religion), collective term for the charismatic, Pentecostal and neo-charismatic churches
Jewish Renewal, a movement in Judaism
Catholic Charismatic Renewal, a movement in the Roman Catholic Church
Renewal Christian Centre, a British megachurch in Solihull

Politics
Renew Europe, a political group in the European Parliament
Renewal (Transnistria), a political party in Transnistria
Renew Party, a British political party launched in 2018
EU Project Renew, a European Union project concerning biomass fuel production
Renew, a name by which a 1970s-80s US group advocating for an Equal Rights Amendment, Religious Committee for the ERA, was known

Other
Urban renewal, a function of urban planning
Renewal theory, a branch of probability theory
Renewal, in psychology, learned fear returns after extinction
Renewalism, a concept in the theory of international relations that holds that a state's ability to renew itself is the test of a great power
Remise (fencing), an attack 
Renew Foundation, a non-governmental organization for empowering women and children exploited through human trafficking and prostitution
ReNEW Schools, a New Orleans charter school operator
Renewal Batteries, a type of rechargeable alkaline batteries made by Rayovac
Renew, an Australian not-for-profit that publishes ReNew magazine